Town meeting is a form of local government in which most or all of the members of a community are eligible to legislate policy and budgets for local government. It is a town- or city-level meeting in which decisions are made, in contrast with town hall meetings held by state and national politicians to answer questions from their constituents, which have no decision-making power.

Town meeting has been used in portions of the United States, principally in New England, since the 17th century. The format has  been characterized as an example of deliberative democracy, and served as a prominent case study in democratic theory.

Overview 
Town meeting is a form of local government practiced in the U.S. region of New England since colonial times and in some western states since at least the late 19th century. Typically conducted by New England towns, town meeting can also refer to meetings of other governmental bodies, such as school districts or water districts. While the uses and laws vary from state to state, the general form is for residents of the town or school district to gather once a year and act as a legislative body, voting on operating budgets, laws, and other matters for the community's operation over the following 12 months.

In 1854, Henry David Thoreau said, in a speech entitled "Slavery in Massachusetts":

The painting Freedom of Speech depicts a scene from a town meeting.

Its usage in the English language can also cause confusion, since it is both an event, as in "Freetown had its town meeting last Tuesday", and an entity, as in "Last Tuesday, Town Meeting decided to repave Howland Road."

In modern times, "town meeting" has also been used by political groups and political candidates as a label for moderated discussion group in which a large audience is invited. To avoid confusion, this sort of event is often called a "town hall meeting."

Origin 
Town records of early New England are scarce, leading to debate about the origin of town meeting. The most common interpretation is that it was adapted from local vestry meetings held in 17th century England, which were responsible for financial decisions of the parish church. The English settlers created parish-based governments modeled after their experience with these local meetings, with town Selectmen analogous to vestry churchwardens. In colonial New England there was very little separation between church and town governance, but town meeting continued to play a secular role after the disestablishment of the state churches and form the core of government for New England Towns today.

Significance in democratic theory 
Since the turn of the nineteenth century, political scientists have characterized New England's town meetings as notable examples of direct and deliberative democracy. In his 1831 visit to New England, the political philosopher Alexis de Tocqueville visited several townships in Massachusetts, remarking in the first volume of Democracy in America (1835) that town governments in New England appeared to show greater political independence than French communes or other municipal bodies in Europe. Tocqueville believed that town meetings, with direct power given to attending residents, trained citizens for participation in broader democratic society, writing that "the institutions of a township are to freedom what primary schools are to science; they make them taste its peaceful employ and habituate them to making use of it." Town meetings also influenced American republican thought, particularly for Thomas Jefferson. Jefferson wrote in 1816 that townships in New England "have proved themselves the wisest invention ever devised by the wit of man for the perfect exercise of self-government and for its preservation."

Town meetings represent some of the only modern institutions, apart from some townships in Minnesota and the cantons of Switzerland, in which everyday citizens can regularly participate in "face-to-face" assemblies that deliberate binding collective action decisions in the form of laws. Proponents of communitarianism and civic republicanism in political thought, notably Frank M. Bryan of the University of Vermont, have advocated town meetings as forms of direct democracy based upon unitary values. Deliberative democrats, such as James Fishkin, have presented the town meeting as a setting of "empowered participation" in which thoughtful deliberation between all participating individuals can coexist with a sense of engaged citizenship and responsibility for solving local problems. Both camps, however, note the difficulties of maintaining the benefits of town meetings when the format is scaled to larger groups.

Other political scientists have expressed more skepticism toward town meetings on the basis of their poor attendance and lack of representativeness. Jane Mansbridge and Donald L. Robinson have argued that town meetings in Vermont and Massachusetts feature extremely low turnout in part because they last for a full working day, leading to disproportionate representation of seniors and non-working residents in the meetings. As participation is still voluntary for attendees of the meeting, Mansbridge also notes differences in participation on the basis of education and class when conflicts arise, writing that "the face-to-face assembly lets those who have no trouble speaking defend their interests; it does not give the average citizen comparable protection." Feminist critics have also identified mixed results in town meetings. While women's rates of attendance at town meetings was nearly equal relative to men's, their  participation in discussion relative to men declined as the size of the town increased.

Connecticut 
Connecticut town meetings are bound to a published agenda. For example, in Connecticut, a Town Meeting may discuss, but not alter, an article placed before them, nor may they place new items on the agenda. If a Town Meeting rejects a budget, a new Town Meeting must be called to consider the next proposed budget. State Law allows the Board of Selectmen to adopt an estimated tax rate and continue operating based on the previous budget in the event a Town Meeting has not adopted a new budget in time.

They also do not exercise the scope of legislative powers as is typically seen in Massachusetts. For example, while many Massachusetts towns adopt and modify land-use and building zoning regulations at Town Meeting, in Connecticut the Town Meeting would have "adopted zoning" as a concept for the town, but the actual writing and adopting of specific regulations fall to an elected Planning & Zoning Board created by the adoption of zoning.

A moderator is chosen at each meeting. Meetings are typically held in school auditoriums, but they may be moved to larger venues as needed. Town meetings can physically meet in another town if necessary to find a proper space to host the attendance. Votes are taken by voice, and if close by show of hands. Meetings on controversial topics are often adjourned to a referendum conducted by machine vote on a date in the future. Such adjournment may come from the floor of the meeting or by a petition for a paper or machine ballot filed before the meeting.

In towns with Open Town Meeting, all registered voters of the town and all persons owning at least $1,000 of taxable property are eligible to participate in and vote at Town Meetings, with the exception of the election of officials. Representative Town Meeting used by some larger towns consists solely of a large number of members elected to office. Some towns use a so-called Financial Town Meeting, where an Open Town Meeting exists with limited jurisdiction to vote only on financial affairs and the town's legislative powers have been vested in a Town Council.

Maine 
In Maine, the town meeting system originated during the period when Maine was a district of Massachusetts. Most cities and towns operate under the town meeting form of government or a modified version of it. Maine annual town meetings traditionally are held in March. Special town meetings also may be called from time to time.

The executive agency of town government is an elected, part-time board, known as the Board of Selectmen, having three, five, or seven members. Between sessions, the board of selectmen interprets the policy set at Town Meeting and is assigned numerous duties including: approving all town non-school expenditures, authorizing highway construction and repair, serving as town purchasing agent for non-school items, issuing licenses, and overseeing the conduct of all town activities. Often the part-time selectmen also serve as town assessors, overseers of the poor, and road commissioners. Generally, there are other elected town officers whose duties are specified by law. These may include clerks, assessors, tax collectors, treasurers, school committee members, constables, and others.

In 1927 the town of Camden adopted a special charter and became the first Maine town to apply the manager concept to the town meeting-selectmen framework. Under this system, the manager is administrative head of town government, responsible to the select board for the administration of all departments under its control. The manager's duties include acting as purchasing agent, seeing that laws and ordinances are enforced, making appointments and removals, and fixing the compensation of appointees. (See also: Council-manager government.)

From 1927 to 1939, eleven other Maine towns adopted special act charters similar to the Camden charter. Today, 135 Maine towns have the town meeting-selectmen-manager system, while 209 use the town meeting-selectmen system.

Massachusetts

History 
The town meeting "was the original and protean vessel of local authority."  The early meetings were informal, with all men in town likely participating.  Even when it did not fully exercise it, "the power of the town meeting knew no limit." Town meeting

created principles to regulate taxation and land distribution; it bought land for town use and forbade the use of it forever to those who could not pay their share within a month; it decided the number of pines each family could cut from the swamp and which families could cover their house with clapboard.  The men who went to that town meeting hammered out the abstract principles under which they would live and regulated the most minute details of their lives.  The decisions they made then affected the lives of their children and grandchildren.

Town meeting often had a reputation for being "active, suspicious, contradictory, and cantankerous," but it was well regarded by others.

In 1692, the Great and General Court declared that final authority on bylaws rested with town meetings and not selectmen. Two years later, in 1694, the General Court took authority to appoint assessors from selectmen and gave it to town meetings. An act of the colonial legislature gave town meeting the right to elect its own moderators in 1715, but this had already been in practice for several years in towns such as Dedham.

A colony law required all voters to be church members until 1647, though it may not have been enforced. The law changed in 1647, requiring voters to be above 24 years of age. The colony added a new requirement that a man must own taxable property with a value of at least 20 pounds in 1658 and increased that sum to 80 pounds in 1670. The 1670 law had a grandfather clause allowing all those who previously were qualified to keep the franchise. In 1691, the property requirement was lowered back to 20 pounds.

In provincial elections, only church members could vote. The number continued to fall from there. While in many respects Massachusetts society resembled England, the franchise was more widespread in the colony than it was in the mother country, as were the powers of local elected officials.

Two forms of town meeting government

Open town meeting 
Open town meeting is the form of town meeting in which all registered voters of a town are eligible to vote, together acting as the town's legislature. Town Meeting is typically held annually in the spring, often over the course of several evenings, but there is also provision to call additional special meetings. Open town meeting is direct democracy, while its alternatives, representative town meeting and town council, are representative democracy.

It is a form of government typical of smaller municipalities in the New England region of the United States. In Massachusetts, towns with fewer than 6,000 residents must adopt the open town meeting form of government. Massachusetts towns with 6,000 or more residents may adopt either open town meeting or the representative town meeting form of government.

The Board of Selectmen summons the town meeting into existence by issuing the warrant, which is the list of items—known as articles—to be voted on, with descriptions of each article.

The Moderator presides over the meeting, making sure that the town's chosen rules of parliamentary procedure are followed, judging the results of voice votes or shows of hands and counting votes that are too close to be judged by eye or ear. The Finance Committee, often called the Advisory Committee, makes recommendations on articles dealing with money and often drafts the proposed budget. The Town Clerk serves as the clerk of the meeting by recording its results. Town Counsel may make legal recommendations on any articles of the warrant, to ensure town meeting is acting lawfully.

Representative town meeting 

Massachusetts towns having at least 6,000 residents may adopt a Representative Town Meeting system through the normal charter change process in the State Legislature. Representative Town Meetings function largely the same as an Open Town Meeting except that not all registered voters can vote. The townspeople instead elect Town Meeting Members by precinct to represent them and to vote on the issues for them. Before it became a city in 2018, Framingham, which at the time was the largest town in the Commonwealth by population, had 216 representatives in Town Meeting, twelve from each precinct.

Annual town meeting 
Annual town meeting is held in the spring and may also be known as the annual budget meeting. Towns were once required to hold their annual town meetings between February 1 and May 31, but Chapter 85 of the Acts of 2008 extended this window of time to June 30. (Town fiscal years start on July 1.)  At this meeting, the town budgets for the new fiscal year and takes care of any outstanding housekeeping items from the current fiscal year. It may also vote on non-budgetary warrant articles, including the town's general and zoning bylaws.

An article may be placed on the warrant by the Selectmen, sometimes at the request of town departments, or by a petition signed by at least ten registered voters of the town.

Special town meetings
Special town meetings are held whenever necessary, usually to deal with financial or other pertinent issues that develop between annual town meetings. They function the same as an annual town meeting, only the number of signatures required on a petition rises to 100. While the Selectmen generally call such a meeting, voters may call one through petition, and the number of signatures required on a petition to call a special town meeting is 200 or 20% of the registered voters, whichever number is lower. The selectmen have 45 days from the date of receiving such a petition to hold a special town meeting.

Joint/regional town meetings
Joint town meetings are a form of town meeting where two or more towns share an operating budget for district activity that includes those towns, for example, a multi-town regional school district. The governing body of that regional district will typically issue each town an assessment for its operation. The town then includes its assessment as part of its budget.

If the town meeting in one town votes to approve its assessment based on the figures provided, and the town meeting in another town votes a lesser figure than it was assessed, the disagreement becomes problematic. If the issue cannot be resolved by a revised budget submitted to subsequent additional individual town meetings, the regional entity's governing body has the authority to call a meeting of all registered voters from all towns in the district: a joint town meeting. The action of the joint town meeting is binding upon all communities of the regional district. When three or more towns are involved, the name often changes from joint town meeting to regional town meeting.

Cities calling themselves towns
The Massachusetts Constitution (in Amendment LXXXIX, which governs the respective powers of municipalities and the state legislature) makes a distinction between a "city form of government" and a "town form of government". In recent years, a number of communities have chosen to adopt a home-rule charter under this Amendment which specifies a city form of government while retaining the style "Town of X", calling their legislative bodies "Town Council", and so on. (The Constitution does not require any specific nomenclature.) In special legislation, these places are sometimes described as "the city known as the town of X".

The Town Meeting legislative body and form of government is a mandatory part of being a town under state municipal law. Massachusetts cities do not have town meetings, because the legislative body is the elected city council, also sometimes called the board of aldermen or, in the case of cities styled as "Town of _", the town council. However, as noted, the official style of a city or town is defined in its charter, and there is no legal barrier to cities calling themselves "town" or vice versa. As a result, not all of the municipalities that entitled Town of _ have a Town Meeting legislative body. (Only communities with a population of at least 12,000 are allowed to adopt a city form of government.)

Common practice distinguishes between a "town meeting" (with an article), which may refer to any such gathering, even if municipal business is not the subject, and "Town Meeting" (never an article), which always refers to the legislative governing body of a town.

New Hampshire 
In New Hampshire, towns, village districts (which can deal with various government activities but usually concern public water supplies) and school districts have the option of choosing one of two types of annual meeting: Traditional meetings, and ballot-vote meetings that are known informally as "SB 2" or "Senate Bill 2". A variation of SB 2 and representative town meeting are also allowed under state law but as of 2015 are not in use by any community.

Traditional town meetings 
Traditional town meeting is held annually on the second Tuesday of March to choose town officers, approve a town budget, and approve large contracts. Town selectmen can call special town meetings throughout the year as needed, although these must be approved by a judge if they affect the budget. State law prohibits town meetings from being held on the biennial election day in November.

State law lets the town moderator adjourn a long-running meeting and reconvene it at a later date to finish the town's business.

Any town meeting or adjournment thereof must have its time and place published with three days' notice, along with the warrant specifying each issue to be decided. Town meeting can amend the warrant articles before voting on them, and can conduct non-binding discussions of other issues, but cannot make other binding votes without this notice to town voters.

Attendance wanes over the course of a town meeting, and a traditional tactic was to re-vote after many on the opposite side had gone home. In 1991, the state enacted RSA 40:10, giving town meeting members the right to bar reconsideration of a specified vote (or any "action...which involves the same subject matter"). If a town meeting does not bar reconsideration and later does vote to reconsider a decision, the issue can be taken up only at an adjourned session at least one week later.

Official ballot referenda (SB 2) 
Official ballot referenda, or the SB 2 format, provides that town voters make binding decisions not at town meeting but by secret ballot in the municipal election. To adopt SB 2, or to revert to traditional town meetings, a question to that effect on the municipal ballot must win a three-fifths majority. This format was instituted by the state legislature in 1995 because of concerns that modern lifestyles had made it difficult for people to attend traditional town meetings. In 2019, however, the law was changed so that the three-fifths majority would have to occur at town meeting itself: The town meeting would have to vote to remove its own final decisions to the municipal ballot.

Under SB 2, a first session, called a "Deliberative Session", is held about a month prior to the town election. This session is similar in many ways to the traditional town meeting. However, unlike the town meeting, while the wording and dollar amounts of proposed ballot measures may be amended, no actual voting on the merits of the proposals takes place.

Deliberative sessions are less well attended, in bodies that have adopted SB 2, than are plenary town meetings in bodies that have not adopted SB 2, as their decisions are not final.  However, the final vote by secret ballot attracts more voters than town meetings do because of the shorter time requirement, and absentees can vote.

Deliberative sessions have been charged with "sabotaging" the intent of a ballot question; for example, changing a warrant article, "To see if the Town will raise and appropriate (amount) for (purpose)" to merely read, "To see."  A 2011 law barred deliberative sessions from deleting the subject matter of a warrant article.  In 2016, petitioners in Exeter submitted an article to place on the ballot an advisory "vote of no confidence" in a school official, and the deliberative session removed the word "no".

The second session, held on a set election day, is when issues such as the town's budget and other measures, known as warrant articles, are voted upon. When adopting SB 2, towns or school districts may hold elections on the second Tuesday in March, the second Tuesday in April, or the second Tuesday in May. The election dates may be changed by majority vote. If a vote is taken to approve the change of the local elections, the date becomes effective the following year.

In 2002, according to the University of New Hampshire Center for Public Policy studies, 171 towns in New Hampshire had traditional town meeting, while 48 had SB 2. Another 15 municipalities, most of them incorporated cities, had no annual meeting. The study found that 102 school districts had traditional town meeting, 64 had SB 2 meeting and 10 had no annual meeting.

Because traditional-meeting communities tend to be smaller, only one third of the state's population was governed by traditional town meetings in 2002 and only 22 percent by traditional school-district meetings.

Official ballot town council 

The Official Ballot Town Council is a variant form of the Town Council, in which certain items are to be placed on the ballot to be voted on by the registered voters. This process mimics the SB 2 process, except that the Town Council makes the determination of what items will go on the ballot.

Budgetary town meeting 
The Budgetary Town Meeting is a variation of the Open Meeting, but only the annual town operating budget as presented by the governing body can be voted on by the registered voters. When a town charter provides for a Budgetary Town Meeting it also must establish the procedures for the transfer of funds among various departments, funds, accounts and agencies as may be necessary during the year.

Representative town meeting 

State law (RSA 49-D:3 (paragraph III)) gives the alternative of a representative town meeting, similar to that of a town council, in which voters elect a small number of residents to act as the legislative body in their stead. Representative town meeting follows the same procedure as traditional town meetings, except they cannot decide matters that state law requires to be placed on the official town ballot. Representative town meeting is selected by a town charter, which may require additional matters to go onto the town ballot.

As of 2006, this form of government is not used in any town or school district in New Hampshire.

Moderator 
Moderators are elected to two-year terms on even years in towns and are elected in city wards at every other city election. The moderator presides over town meetings, regulates their business, prescribes rules of procedure, decides questions of order, and declares the outcome of each vote. Town meeting voters can override the moderator's procedural rulings.

The moderator also has the authority to postpone and reschedule the town meeting (or deliberative session, if SB 2 is in effect) to another reasonable date, place, and time certain in the case of a weather emergency in which the moderator reasonably believes the roads to be hazardous or unsafe.

The 2017 municipal election was preceded by a large snowstorm, and the Secretary of State clarified that this statutory authority does not extend to postponing elections, but moderators in several towns did so anyway. In 2019, the NH General Court passed, and the Governor signed, SB 104, which created a procedure to postpone elections. It empowers the Town moderator, based on National Weather Service reports and after consultations with other officials and the Secretary of State, to postpone elections. As stated in at the beginning of the bill, it "provides for the postponement of town, city, village, and school district elections in the event of a winter storm warning, blizzard warning, or ice storm warning.  The bill also allows any person to vote absentee in the event of such a warning if he or she has concerns for his or her safety."

New York 
Town meetings were the rule in New York from the colonial period into the 20th century. They were typically held between February 1 and May 1 of each year primarily for the election of town officials but were also empowered to set "rules for fences and for impounding animals," supporting the poor, raising taxes, and to "determine any other question lawfully submitted to them". In the late 1890s the state legislature shifted the meetings – by this time no more than town elections – to biennial to conform to the pattern of federal, state, and municipal elections in the state's cities. It also permitted, and later directed, town meetings to be held in November. That process was not complete until the 1920s. Laws adopted in 1932 for the first time refer to "Biennial town elections", stating that these were "a substitute for a town meeting...and a reference in any law to a town meeting or special town meeting shall be construed as reference to a town election".  The state's school districts (independent units with taxing powers) voted on budgets and capital levies and elected school board members in town-meeting style until the late 1950s.

Rhode Island 
Due to a change in the state's constitution, Rhode Island municipalities have a greater degree of home rule compared to the other New England states. Like Connecticut, a few towns utilize a so-called Financial Town Meeting in which an Open Town Meeting exists with limited jurisdiction to vote only on financial affairs and the town's legislative powers have been vested in a Town Council. The direct democracy tradition is now uncommon in Rhode Island. Ten towns have town meeting governments: Barrington, Exeter, Foster, Glocester, Hopkinton, Little Compton, Richmond, Scituate, Tiverton, and West Greenwich.

Vermont 

Vermont towns are normally required to hold an annual town meeting on the Monday preceding the first Tuesday in March, beginning at 7:30 p.m. at a place designated by the selectmen.  The date of the annual Town meeting may be changed by a vote of the citizens at a Town meeting duly warned for that purpose. The purpose of town meeting is to elect municipal officers, approve annual budgets and conduct any other business. All cities and some towns in Vermont operate under charters instead of general legislation (see special legislation). The cities and chartered towns, except for South Burlington, are required by the terms of their charters to hold an annual town meeting, on Town Meeting Day. Many towns vote on matters of substance (e.g., budgets, elected officials, etc.) by secret ballot (also known as Australian ballot). However, there is no state law that requires towns to vote by Australian ballot; several towns still conduct all business "from the floor".

Cities and towns are governed by either a city council or a select board. They are fully empowered to act on most issues and are generally referred to as the municipality's legislative body. But all town budgets (and those of other independent taxing authorities) must be approved by plebiscite; explaining the local government's budget request to the voters is the principal business of Town Meeting. Voters at Town Meeting may also vote on non-binding resolutions, and may place items on the ballot for the following year's meeting.

There is no general requirement for chartered municipalities to observe town meeting or to put their budgets to plebiscite. When the Town of South Burlington was re-chartered as the City of South Burlington in 1971, the new charter provided for city elections in April and required only budget increases of 10% or more per annum to be placed before voters. No other municipality has been granted such a charter by the legislature, and there is strong sentiment against making future exceptions.

According to the Vermont Secretary of State's Citizen's Guide to Town Meeting, Vermont gives state employees the day off on town meeting day. Vermont "law also gives a private employee the right to take unpaid leave from work to attend his or her annual town meeting, subject to the essential operation of the business or government. Employees must provide at least seven days notice to their employer to take advantage of this right to attend town meeting. Students who are over 18 also have the right to attend town meeting" and not be declared truant.

Moderator 
Moderators are elected to one-year terms. The moderator's duties include reviewing the warrant (published agenda) for town meeting, presiding over town meeting, deciding questions of order, making public declarations of each vote passed, and prescribing rules of the proceeding.

Other states 
Towns in several western states and counties also practice town meeting, though generally with more limited powers. Michigan was the first western state to adopt the town meeting system, but it was initially very restricted in its function.

Minnesota has had town meetings as the policy-setting bodies of townships. They were required once the voting population of a township reached 25 persons. Townships still hold town meetings.

Other countries

Spain 
Some small municipalities of Spain operate under a town meeting system called a Concejo abierto ("open council") that dates from the middle ages. The Spanish constitution allows municipalities with fewer than 100 people, as well as municipalities that have traditionally used the system, to operate under an open council.

Basque Country 
The best-known example of the Spanish town meeting system of government was found in the Middle Ages in the Basque Country of northern Spain. Known as the anteiglesia (literally "in front of the church" from the Latin ante - and not anti) all the residents of a town would meet outside the door of the largest church and vote on local matters. They would also elect a sindico to represent them in the regional assembly. The village or town was divided into cofradías, which dealt with day-to-day administration in each of the town's parishes.

The system was revived in the municipality of Iurreta, Biscay in 1990.

Switzerland 
Town meetings are the usual legislative body of the smaller municipalities of Switzerland, that is of approximately 90% of all Swiss municipalities. The meetings are usually held twice a year. At the cantonal level, some regions also hold Landsgemeinde, annual meetings for deciding on legislative referendums.  In the 17th century this was common across the region, but in the 21st century the meetings continue to exist only in the cantons of Appenzell Innerrhoden and Glarus.

Notes

References

Works cited

Further reading
 Bryan, Frank M., Real Democracy: The New England Town Meeting and How it Works, Chicago and London: University of Chicago Press, 2004.
  
 Mansbridge, Jane, Beyond Adversary Democracy, Chicago and London: University of Chicago Press, 1980, provides an in-depth account of the dynamics in one Vermont town of about 500 people.
 
 Robinson, Donald. Town Meeting: Practicing Democracy in Rural New England (University of Massachusetts Press; 2011) 344 pages; analyzes the rocky but productive process of town-meeting democracy in Ashfield, Mass., a community of just under 2,000 in the Berkshires.
 Zuckerman, Michael. "The Social Context of Democracy in Massachusetts," William and Mary Quarterly  (1968) 25:523-544  in JSTOR
Town meeting time: A handbook of parliamentary law

External links 

Maine
 UMaine Margaret Chase Smith Center for Public Policy
 Maine Municipal Association

Massachusetts
 Citizen's Guide to Town Meetings prepared by William Francis Galvin, Massachusetts Secretary of the Commonwealth.

New Hampshire
 NH RSA Chapter 40: Government of Town Meeting
 N.H. Center for Public Policy Studies report on SB2

Community building
Deliberative groups
Direct democracy
History of New England
Local government in the United States
Local government in Maine
Local government in New Hampshire
Local government in Vermont
Local government in Massachusetts
Local government in Connecticut
Meetings
New England
New England towns
Vermont culture
Popular assemblies